Herbert Reich (born 18 July 1938 in Munich) is a German former sailor who competed in the 1964 Summer Olympics.

Herbert won the silver medal during the 2012 Vintage Yachting Games, this time as helmsmen, in the same 5.5 Metre as he competed in during the 1964 Olympics.

References

1938 births
Living people
German male sailors (sport)
Olympic sailors of the United Team of Germany
Sailors at the 1964 Summer Olympics – 5.5 Metre
Sportspeople from Munich